The Huachuca springsnail scientific name Pyrgulopsis thompsoni, is a species of very small freshwater snail with an operculum, an aquatic gastropod mollusk in the family Hydrobiidae.

This species is endemic to the United States.  Its natural habitat is rivers. It is threatened by habitat loss.

References

Molluscs of the United States
Pyrgulopsis
Gastropods described in 1988
Taxonomy articles created by Polbot